Jason J. Servis (born April 2, 1957) is an American trainer of Thoroughbred racehorses.  He is best known for having trained Maximum Security, who finished first in the 2019 Kentucky Derby but was disqualified for interference.

He is a brother of trainer John Servis, of Smarty Jones fame.

In March 2020, Servis was arrested after having been indicted along with 27 other people by federal authorities on charges related to manufacturing, procuring, distributing and administering illegal substances to racehorses. Servis' trial was scheduled to begin in early 2023, but in December 2022 he accepted a plea deal from the U.S. District Attorney's Office by pleading guilty to two new charges of misbranding and adulterating chemical substances intended to be used in racehorses. The original charges, which carried a potential prison term of 25 years, were dropped. Servis now faces up to four years in prison when he is sentenced in May 2023.

References

1957 births
Living people
American horse trainers
People from Charles Town, West Virginia